The following is the list of the 286 plant communities which comprise the British National Vegetation Classification (NVC). These are grouped by major habitat category, as used in the five volumes of British Plant Communities, the standard work describing the NVC.

Woodland and scrub communities 

The following 25 communities are described in Volume 1 of British Plant Communities. For an article summarising these communities see Woodland and scrub communities in the British National Vegetation Classification system.

 W1 Salix cinerea - Galium palustre woodland
 W2 Salix cinerea - Betula pubescens - Phragmites australis woodland
 W3 Salix pentandra - Carex rostrata woodland
 W4 Betula pubescens - Molinia caerulea woodland
 W5 Alnus glutinosa - Carex paniculata woodland
 W6 Alnus glutinosa - Urtica dioica woodland
 W7 Alnus glutinosa - Fraxinus excelsior - Lysimachia nemorum woodland
 W8 Fraxinus excelsior - Acer campestre - Mercurialis perennis woodland
 W9 Fraxinus excelsior - Sorbus aucuparia - Mercurialis perennis woodland
 W10 Quercus robur - Pteridium aquilinum - Rubus fruticosus woodland
 W11 Quercus petraea - Betula pubescens - Oxalis acetosella woodland
 W12 Fagus sylvatica - Mercurialis perennis woodland
 W13 Taxus baccata woodland
 W14 Fagus sylvatica - Rubus fruticosus woodland
 W15 Fagus sylvatica - Deschampsia flexuosa woodland
 W16 Quercus spp. - Betula spp. - Deschampsia flexuosa woodland
 W17 Quercus petraea - Betula pubescens - Dicranum majus woodland
 W18 Pinus sylvestris - Hylocomium splendens woodland
 W19 Juniperus communis ssp. communis - Oxalis acetosella woodland
 W20 Salix lapponum - Luzula sylvatica scrub
 W21 Crataegus monogyna - Hedera helix scrub
 W22 Prunus spinosa - Rubus fruticosus scrub
 W23 Ulex europaeus - Rubus fruticosus scrub
 W24 Rubus fruticosus - Holcus lanatus underscrub
 W25 Pteridium aquilinum - Rubus fruticosus underscrub

Mires  

The following 38 communities are described in Volume 2 of British Plant Communities. For an article summarising these communities see Mires in the British National Vegetation Classification system.

 M1  Sphagnum auriculatum bog pool community
 M2  Sphagnum cuspidatum/recurvum bog pool community
 M3 Eriophorum angustifolium bog pool community
 M4 Carex rostrata - Sphagnum recurvum mire
 M5 Carex rostrata - Sphagnum squarrosum mire
 M6 Carex echinata - Sphagnum recurva/auriculatum mire
 M7 Carex curta - Sphagnum russowii mire
 M8 Carex rostrata - Sphagnum warnstorfii mire
 M9 Carex rostrata - Calligeron cuspidatum/giganteum mire
 M10 Carex dioica - Pinguicula vulgaris mire Pinguiculo-Caricetum dioicae Jones 1973 emend.
 M11 Carex demissa - Saxifraga aizoides mire  Carici-Saxifragetum aizoidis McVean & Ratcliffe 1962 emend.
 M12 Carex saxatilis mire Caricetum saxatilis McVean & Ratcliffe 1962
 M13 Schoenus nigricans - Juncus subnodulosus mire Schoenetum nigricantis Koch 1926
 M14 Schoneus nigricans - Narthecium ossifragum mire
 M15 Scirpus cespitosus - Erica tetralix wet heath
 M16 Erica tetralix - Sphagnum compactum wet heath Ericetum tetralicis Schwickerath 1933
 M17 Scirpus cespitosus - Eriophorum vaginatum blanket mire
 M18 Erica tetralix - Sphagnum papillosum raised and blanket mire
 M19 Calluna vulgaris - Eriophorum vaginatum blanket mire
 M20 Eriophorum vaginatum raised and blanket mire
 M21 Narthecium ossifragum - Sphagnum papillosum valley mire Narthecio-Sphagnetum euatlanticum Duvigneaud 1949
 M22 Juncus subnodulosus - Cirsium palustre fen-meadow
 M23 Juncus effusus/acutiflorus - Galium palustre rush-pasture
 M24 Molinia caerulea - Cirsium dissectum fen-meadow Cirsium-Molinietum caeruleae Sissingh & De Vries 1942 emend.
 M25 Molinia caerulea - Potentilla erecta mire
 M26 Molinia caerulea - Crepis paludosa mire
 M27 Filipendula ulmaria - Angelica sylvestris mire
 M28 Iris pseudacorus - Filipendula ulmaria mire Filipendulo-Iridetum pseudacori Adam 1976 emend.
 M29 Hypericum elodes - Potamogeton polygonifolius soakway Hyperico-Potametum polygonifolii (Allorge 1921) Braun-Blanquet & Tüxen 1952
 M30 Related vegetation of seasonally-inundated habitats Hydrocotyla-Baldellion Tüxen & Dierssen 1972
 M31 Anthelia judacea - Sphagnum auriculatum spring Sphagno auriculati-Anthelietum judaceae Shimwell 1972
 M32 Philonotis fontana - Saxifraga stellaris spring Philonoto-Saxifragetum stellaris Nordhagen 1943
 M33 Pohlia wahlenbergii var. glacialis spring Pohlietum glacialis McVean & Ratcliffe 1962
 M34 Carex demissa - Koenigia islandica flush
 M35 Ranunculus omiophyllus - Montia fontana rill
 M36 Lowland springs and streambanks of shaded situations Cardaminion (Maas 1959) Westhoff & den Held 1969
 M37 Cratoneuron commutatum - Festuca rubra spring
 M38 Cratoneuron commutatum - Carex nigra spring

Heaths 

The following 22 communities are described in Volume 2 of British Plant Communities. For an article summarising these communities see Heaths in the British National Vegetation Classification system.

 H1 Calluna vulgaris - Festuca ovina heath
 H2  Calluna vulgaris - Ulex minor heath
 H3  Ulex minor - Agrostis curtisii heath
 H4  Ulex gallii - Agrostis curtisii heath
 H5  Erica vagans - Schoenus nigricans heath
 H6  Erica vagans - Ulex europaeus heath
 H7  Calluna vulgaris - Scilla verna heath
 H8  Calluna vulgaris - Ulex gallii heath
 H9  Calluna vulgaris - Deschampsia flexuosa heath
 H10 Calluna vulgaris - Erica cinerea heath
 H11 Calluna vulgaris - Carex arenaris heath
 H12 Calluna vulgaris - Vaccinium myrtillus heath
 H13 Calluna vulgaris - Cladonia arbuscula heath
 H14 Calluna vulgaris - Racomitrium lanuginosum heath
 H15 Calluna vulgaris - Juniperus communis ssp. nana heath
 H16 Calluna vulgaris - Arctostaphylos uva-ursi heath
 H17 Calluna vulgaris - Arctostaphylos alpinus heath
 H18 Vaccinium myrtillus - Deschampsia flexuosa heath
 H19 Vaccinium myrtillus - Cladonia arbuscula heath
 H20 Vaccinium myrtillus - Racomitrium lanuginosum heath
 H21 Calluna vulgaris - Vaccinium myrtillus - Sphagnum capillifolium heath
 H22 Vaccinium myrtillus - Rubus chamaemorus heath

Mesotrophic grasslands 

The following 13 communities are described in Volume 3 of British Plant Communities. For an article summarising these communities see Mesotrophic grasslands in the British National Vegetation Classification system.

 MG1 Arrhenatherum elatius grassland Arrhenatheretum elatioris Br.-Bl. 1919
 MG2 Arrhenatherum elatius - Filipendula ulmaria tall-herb grassland Filipendulo-Arrhenatheretum elatioris Shimwell 1968a
 MG3 Anthoxanthum odoratum - Geranium sylvaticum grassland
 MG4 Alopecurus pratensis - Sanguisorba officinalis grassland
 MG5 Cynosurus cristatus - Centaurea nigra grassland Centaureo-Cynosuretum cristati Br.-Bl. & Tx 1952
 MG6 Lolium perenne - Cynosurus cristatus grassland Lolio-Cynosuretum cristati (Br.-Bl. & De Leeuw 1936) R. Tx 1937
 MG7 Lolium perenne leys and related grasslands Lolio-Plantaginion Sissingh 1969 p.p.
 MG8 Cynosurus cristatus - Caltha palustris grassland
 MG9 Holcus lanatus - Deschampsia cespitosa grassland
 MG10 Holcus lanatus - Juncus effusus rush-pasture Holco-Juncetum effusi Page 1980
 MG11 Festuca rubra - Agrostis stolonifera - Potentilla anserina grassland
 MG12 Festuca arundinacea  grassland Potentillo-Festucetum arundinaceae Nordhagen 1940
 MG13 Agrostis stolonifera - Alopecurus geniculatus grassland
 MG14 Carex nigra - Agrostis stolonifera - Senecio aquaticus  grassland
 MG15 Alopecurus pratensis - Poa trivialis - Cardamine pratensis  grassland
 MG16 Agrostis stolonifera - Eleocharis palustris  grassland

Calcicolous grasslands 

The following 14 communities are described in Volume 3 of British Plant Communities. For an article summarising these communities see Calcicolous grasslands in the British National Vegetation Classification system.

 CG1 Festuca ovina - Carlina vulgaris grassland
 CG2 Festuca ovina - Avenula pratensis grassland
 CG3 Bromus erectus grassland
 CG4 Brachypodium pinnatum grassland
 CG5 Bromus erectus - Brachypodium pinnatum grassland
 CG6 Avenula pubescens grassland
 CG7 Festuca ovina - Hieracium pilosella - Thymus praecox/pulegioides grassland
 CG8 Sesleria albicans - Scabiosa columbaria grassland
 CG9 Sesleria albicans - Galium sterneri grassland
 CG10 Festuca ovina - Agrostis capillaris - Thymus praecox grassland
 CG11 Festuca ovina - Agrostis capillaris - Alchemilla alpina grass-heath
 CG12 Festuca ovina - Alchemilla alpina - Silene acaulis dwarf-herb community
 CG13 Dryas octopetala - Carex flacca heath
 CG14 Dryas octopetala - Silene acaulis ledge community

Calcifugous grasslands and montane communities 

The following 21 communities are described in Volume 3 of British Plant Communities. For an article summarising these communities see Calcifugous grasslands and montane communities in the British National Vegetation Classification system.

 U1 Festuca ovina - Agrostris capillaris - Rumex acetosella grassland
 U2 Deschampsia flexuosa grassland
 U3 Agrostis curtisii grassland
 U4 Festuca ovina - Agrostris capillaris - Galium saxatile grassland
 U5 Nardus stricta - Galium saxatile grassland
 U6 Juncus squarrosus - Festuca ovina grassland
 U7 Nardus stricta - Carex bigelowii grass-heath
 U8 Carex bigelowii - Polytrichum alpinum sedge-heath
 U9 Juncus trifidus - Racomitrium lanuginosum rush-heath
 U10 Carex bigelowii  - Racomitrium lanuginosum moss-heath
 U11 Polytrichum sexangulare - Kiaeria starkei snow-bed
 U12 Salix herbacea - Racomitrium heterostichum snow-bed
 U13 Deschampsia cespitosa - Galium saxatile grassland
 U14 Alchemilla alpina - Sibbaldia procumbens dwarf-herb community
 U15 Saxifraga aizoides - Alchemilla glabra banks
 U16 Luzula sylvatica - Vaccinium myrtillus tall-herb community
 U17 Luzula sylvatica - Geum rivale tall-herb community
 U18 Cryptogramma crispa - Athyrium distentifolium snow-bed
 U19 Thelypteris limbosperma - Blechnum spicant community
 U20 Pteridium aquilinum - Galium saxatile community
 U21 Cryptogramma crispa - Deschampsia flexuosa community

Aquatic communities 

The following 24 communities are described in Volume 4 of British Plant Communities. For an article summarising these communities see Aquatic communities in the British National Vegetation Classification system.

 A1Lemna gibba community Lemnetum gibbae Miyawaki & J. Tx. 1960
 A2 Lemna minor community Lemnetum minoris Soó 1947
 A3 Spirodela polyrhiza - Hydrocharis morsus-ranae community
 A4 Hydrocharis morsus-ranae - Stratiotes aloides community
 A5 Ceratophyllum demersum community Certaophylletum demersi Hild 1956
 A6 Ceratophyllum submersum community Certaophylletum submersi Den Hartog & Segal 1964
 A7 Nymphaea alba community Nymphaeetum albae Oberdorfer & Mitarb. 1967
 A8 Nuphar lutea community
 A9 Potamogeton natans community
 A10 Polygonum amphibium community
 A11 Potamogeton pectinatus - Myriophyllum spicatum community
 A12 Potamogeton pectinatus community
 A13 Potamogeton perfoliatus - Myriophyllum alterniflorum community
 A14 Myriophyllum alterniflorum community Myriophylletum alterniflori
 A15 Elodea canadensis community
 A16 Callitriche stagnalis community
 A17 Ranunculus penicillatus ssp. pseudofluitans community
 A18 Ranunculus fluitans community Ranunculetum fluitantis Allorge 1922
 A19 Ranunculus aquatilis community Ranunculetum aquatilis Géhu 1961
 A20 Ranunculus peltatus community Ranunculetum peltati Sauer 1947
 A21 Ranunculus baudotii community Ranunculetum baudotii Br.-Bl. 1952
 A22 Littorella uniflora - Lobelia dortmanna community
 A23 Isoetes lacustris/setacea community
 A24 Juncus bulbosus community

Swamps and tall-herb fens 

The following 28 communities are described in Volume 4 of British Plant Communities. For an article summarising these communities see Swamps and tall-herb fens in the British National Vegetation Classification system.

 S1  Carex elata sedge-swamp Caricetum elatae Koch 1926
 S2  Cladium mariscus swamp and sedge-beds Cladietum marisci Zobrist 1933 emend. Pfeiffer 1961
 S3  Carex paniculata swamp Caricetum paniculatae Wangerin 1916
 S4  Phragmites australis swamp and reed-beds Phragmitetum australis (Gams 1927) Schmale 1939
 S5  Glyceria maxima swamp Glycerietum maximae (Nowinski 1928) Hueck 1931 emend. Krausch 1965
 S6  Carex riparia swamp Caricetum ripariae Soó 1928
 S7  Carex acutiformis swamp Caricetum acutiformis Sauer 1937
 S8  Scirpus lacustris ssp. lacustris swamp Scirpetum lacustris (Allorge 1922) Chouard 1924
 S9  Carex rostrata swamp Caricetum rostratae Rübel 1912
 S10 Equisetum fluviatile swamp Equisetetum fluviatile Steffen 1931 emend. Wilczek 1935
 S11 Carex vesicaria swamp Caricetum vesicariae Br.-Bl. & Denis 1926
 S12 Typha latifolia swamp Typhetum latifoliae Soó 1927
 S13 Typha angustifolia swamp Typhetum angustifoliae Soó 1927
 S14 Sparganium erectum swamp Sparganietum erecti Roll 1938
 S15 Acorus calamus swamp Acoretum calami Schulz 1941
 S16 Sagittaria sagittifolia swamp
 S17 Carex pseudocyperus swamp
 S18 Carex otrubae swamp Caricetum otrubae Mirza 1978
 S19 Eleocharis palustris swamp Eleocharitetum palustris Schennikow 1919
 S20 Scirpus lacustris ssp. tabernaemontani swamp Scirpetum tabernaemontani Passarge 1964
 S21 Scirpus maritimus swamp Scirpetum maritimi (Br.-Bl. 1931) R.Tx. 1937
 S22 Glyceria fluitans water-margin vegetation Glycerietum fluitantis Wilczek 1935
 S23 Other water-margin vegetation Glycerio-Sparganion Br.-Bl. & Sissingh apud Boer 1942 emend. Segal
 S24 Phragmites australis - Peucedanum palustre tall-herb fen Peucedano-Phragmitetum australis Wheeler 1978 emend.
 S25 Phragmites australis - Eupatorium cannabinum tall-herb fen
 S26 Phragmites australis - Urtica dioica tall-herb fen
 S27 Carex rostrata - Potentilla palustris tall-herb fen Potentillo-Caricetum rostratae Wheeler 1980a
 S28 Phalaris arundinacea tall-herb fen Phalaridetum arundinaceae Libbert 1931

Salt-marsh communities 

The following 28 communities are described in Volume 5 of British Plant Communities. For an article summarising these communities see Salt-marsh communities in the British National Vegetation Classification system.

 SM1 Zostera communities Zosterion Christiansen 1934
 SM2  Ruppia maritima salt-marsh community Ruppietum maritimae Hocquette 1927
 SM3  Eleocharis parvula salt-marsh community Eleocharitetum parvulae (Preuss 1911/12) Gillner 1960
 SM4  Spartina maritima salt-marsh community Spartinetum maritimae (Emb. & Regn. 1926) Corillion 1953
 SM5  Spartina alterniflora salt-marsh community Spartinetum alterniflorae Corillion 1953
 SM6  Spartina anglica salt-marsh community Spartinetum townsendii (Tansley 1939) Corillion 1953
 SM7  Arthrocnemum perenne stands
 SM8  Annual Salicornia salt-marsh community Salicornietum europaeae Warming 1906
 SM9  Suaeda maritima salt-marsh community Suaedetum maritimae (Conrad 1935) Pignatti 1953
 SM10 Transitional low-marsh vegetation with Puccinellia maritima, annual Salicornia species and Suaeda maritima
 SM11 Aster tripolium var. discoideus salt-marsh community Asteretum tripolii Tansley 1939
 SM12 Rayed Aster tripolium on salt-marshes
 SM13 Puccinellia maritima salt-marsh community Puccinellietum maritimae (Warming 1906) Christiansen 1927
 SM14 Halimione portaculoides salt-marsh community Halimionetum portulacoidis (Kuhnholtz-Lordat 1927) Des Abbayes & Corillion 1949
 SM15 Juncus maritimus - Triglochin maritima salt-marsh community
 SM16 Festuca rubra salt-marsh community Juncetum gerardi Warming 1906
 SM17 Artemisia maritima salt-marsh community Artemisietum maritimae Hocquette 1927
 SM18 Juncus maritimus salt-marsh community
 SM19 Blysmus rufus salt-marsh community  Blysmetum rufi (G.E. & G. Du Rietz 1925) Gillner 1960
 SM20 Eleocharis uniglumis salt-marsh community Eleocharitetum uniglumis Nordhagen 1923
 SM21 Suaeda vera - Limonium binervosum salt-marsh community
 SM22 Halimione portulacoides - Frankenia laevis salt-marsh community Limonio vulgaris - Frankenietum laevis Géhu & Géhu-Franck 1975
 SM23 Spergularia marina - Puccinellia distans salt-marsh community Puccinellietum distantis Feekes (1934) 1945
 SM24 Elymus pycnanthus salt-marsh community Atriplici-Elymetum pycnanthi Beeftink & Westhoff 1962
 SM25 Suaeda vera drift-line community Elymo pycnanthi - Suaedetum verae (Arènes 1933) Géhu 1975
 SM26 Inula crithmoides on salt-marshes
 SM27 Ephermeral salt-marsh vegetation with Sagina maritima Saginion maritimae Westhoff, van Leeuwen & Adriani 1962
 SM28 Elymus repens salt-marsh community Elymetum repentis maritimum Nordhagen 1940

Shingle, strandline and sand-dune communities 

The following 19 communities are described in Volume 5 of British Plant Communities. For an article summarising these communities see Shingle, strandline and sand-dune communities in the British National Vegetation Classification system.

 SD1  Rumex crispus - Glaucium flavum shingle community
 SD2  Honkenya peploides - Cakile maritima strandline community
 SD3  Matricaria maritima - Galium aparine strandline community
 SD4  Elymus farctus ssp. boreali-atlanticus foredune community
 SD5  Leymus arenarius mobile dune community
 SD6  Ammophila arenaria mobile dune community
 SD7  Ammophila arenaria - Festuca rubra semi-fixed dune community
 SD8  Festuca rubra - Galium verum fixed dune grassland
 SD9  Ammophila arenaria - Arrhenatherum elatius dune grassland
 SD10 Carex arenaria dune community
 SD11 Carex arenaria - Cornicularia aculeata dune community
 SD12 Carex arenaria - Festuca ovina - Agrostis capillaris dune grassland
 SD13 Sagina nodosa - Bryum pseudotriquetrum dune-slack community
 SD14 Salix repens - Campylium stellatum dune-slack community
 SD15 Salix repens - Calliergon cuspidatum dune-slack community
 SD16 Salix repens - Holcus lanatus dune-slack community
 SD17 Potentilla anserina - Carex nigra dune-slack community
 SD18 Hippophae rhamnoides dune scrub
 SD19 Phleum arenarium - Arenaria serpyllifolia dune annual community Tortulo-Phleetum arenariae (Massart 1908) Br.-Bl. & de Leeuw 1936

Maritime cliff communities 

The following 12 communities are described in Volume 5 of British Plant Communities. For an article summarising these communities see Maritime cliff communities in the British National Vegetation Classification system.

 MC1  Crithmum maritimum - Spergularia rupicola maritime rock-crevice community Crithmo-Spergularietum rupicolae Géhu 1964
 MC2  Armeria maritima - Ligusticum scoticum maritime rock-crevice community
 MC3  Rhodiola rosea - Armeria maritima maritime cliff-ledge community
 MC4  Brassica oleracea maritime cliff-ledge community
 MC5  Armeria maritima - Cerastium diffusum ssp. diffusum maritime therophyte community
 MC6  Atriplex prostrata - Beta vulgaris ssp. maritima sea-bird cliff community Atriplici-Betetum maritimae J.-M. & J. Géhu 1969
 MC7  Stellaria media - Rumex acetosa sea-bird cliff community
 MC8  Festuca rubra - Armeria maritima maritime grassland
 MC9  Festuca rubra - Holcus lanatus maritime grassland
 MC10 Festuca rubra - Plantago spp.  maritime grassland
 MC11 Festuca rubra - Daucus carota ssp. gummifer maritime grassland
 MC12 Festuca rubra - Hyacinthoides non-scripta maritime bluebell community

Vegetation of open habitats 

The following 42 communities are described in Volume 5 of British Plant Communities. For an article summarising these communities see Vegetation of open habitats in the British National Vegetation Classification system.

 OV1  Viola arvensis - Aphanes microcarpa community
 OV2  Briza minor - Silene gallica community
 OV3  Papaver rhoeas - Viola arvensis community Papaveretum argemones (Libbert 1933) Kruseman & Vlieger 1939
 OV4  Chrysanthemum segetum - Spergula arvensis community Spergulo-Chrysanthemetum segetum (Br.-Bl. & De Leeuw 1936) R. Tx. 1937
 OV5  Digitaria ischaemum - Erodium cicutarium community
 OV6  Cerastium glomeratum - Fumaria borealis ssp. boraei community
 OV7  Veronica persica - Veronica polita community Veronico - Lamietum hybridi Kruseman & Vlieger 1939
 OV8  Veronica persica - Alopecurus myosuroides community Alopecuro-Chamomilletum recutitae Wasscher 1941
 OV9  Matricaria perforata - Stellaria media community
 OV10 Poa annua - Senecio vulgaris community
 OV11 Poa annua - Stachys arvensis community
 OV12 Poa annua - Myosotis arvensis community
 OV13 Stellaria media - Capsella bursa-pastoris community
 OV14 Urtica urens - Lamium amplexicaule community
 OV15 Anagallis arvensis - Veronica persica community Kickxietum spuriae Kruseman & Vlieger 1939
 OV16 Papaver rhoeas - Silene noctiflora community Papaveri-Sileneetum noctiflori Wasscher 1941
 OV17 Reseda lutea - Polygonum aviculare community Descurainio-Anchusetum arvensis Silverside 1977
 OV18 Polygonum aviculare - Chamomilla suavolens community
 OV19 Poa annua - Matricaria perforata community
 OV20 Poa annua - Sagina procumbens community Sagino - Bryetum argentii Diemont, Sissingh & Westhoff 1940
 OV21 Poa annua - Plantago major community
 OV22 Poa annua - Taraxacum officinale community
 OV23 Lolium perenne - Dactylis glomerata community
 OV24 Urtica dioica - Galium aparine community
 OV25 Urtica dioica - Cirsium arvense community
 OV26 Epilobium hirsutum community
 OV27 Epilobium angustifolium community
 OV28 Agrostis stolonifera - Ranunculus repens community Agrostio - Ranunculetum repentis Oberdorfer et al. 1967
 OV29 Alopecurus geniculatus - Rorippa palustris community Ranunculo - Alopecuretum geniculati R. Tx. (1937) 1950
 OV30 Bidens tripartita - Polygonum amphibium community Polygono - Bidentetum tripartitae Lohmeyer in R. Tx. 1950
 OV31 Rorippa palustris - Filaginella uliginosa community
 OV32 Myosotis scorpioides - Ranunculus sceleratus community Ranunculetum scelerati R. Tx. 1950 ex Passarge 1959
 OV33 Polygonum lapathifolium - Poa annua community
 OV34 Allium schoenoprasum - Plantago maritima community
 OV35 Lythrum portula - Ranunculus flammula community
 OV36 Lythrum hyssopifolia - Juncus bufonius community
 OV37 Festuca ovina - Minuartia verna community Minuartio-Thlaspietum alpestris Koch 1932
 OV38 Gymnocarpium robertianum - Arrhenatherum elatius community Gymnocarpietum robertianae (Kuhn 1937) R. Tx. 1937
 OV39 Asplenium trichomanes - Asplenium ruta-muraria community Asplenietum trichomano-rutae-murariae R. Tx. 1937
 OV40 Asplenium viride - Cystopteris fragilis community Asplenio viridis-Cystopteridetum fragilis (Kuhn 1939) Oberdorfer 1977
 OV41 Parietaria diffusa community Parietarietum judaicae (Arènes 1928) Oberdorfer 1977
 OV42 Cymbalaria muralis community Cymbalarietum muralis Görs 1966

.
plant communities
.
.
National Vegetation Classification
British National Vegetation Classification